Guillermo Evans (April 27, 1923 – November 1, 1981)  was an Argentine athlete who competed in the 1948 Summer Olympics in the 400m and 4x400m relay, but he failed to advance past the first round in either event.

References
 Sports Reference Profile

1923 births
1981 deaths
Argentine male sprinters
Olympic athletes of Argentina
Athletes (track and field) at the 1948 Summer Olympics
Athletes (track and field) at the 1951 Pan American Games
Pan American Games competitors for Argentina
Sportspeople from Córdoba, Argentina